Amy Allcock (born 20 August 1993) is a British athlete. She competed in the women's 4 × 400 metres relay at the 2018 IAAF World Indoor Championships.

References

External links
 
 
 
 

1993 births
Living people
British female sprinters
World Athletics Indoor Championships medalists
Athletes from London